The Intruders are an American soul music group most popular in the 1960s and 1970s. As one of the first groups to have hit songs under the direction of Kenny Gamble and Leon Huff, they were a major influence on the development of Philadelphia soul.

The Intruders are also noted for having 24 R&B chart hits, including 6 R&B Top Tens, and 14 chart hits in the Billboard Hot 100, including their signature song, the million-selling Top 10 smash, "Cowboys to Girls." Other hits include the Top 10 R&B smashes "(Love Is Like A) Baseball Game", "Together", "I'll Always Love My Mama", "United", and "I Wanna Know Your Name". The original members, all natives of Philadelphia, were Samuel "Little Sonny" Brown, Eugene "Bird" Daughtry, Phil Terry, and Robert "Big Sonny" Edwards.

Biography
Formed in 1960, the group originally consisted of Sam "Little Sonny" Brown, Eugene "Bird" Daughtry, Phillip "Phil" Terry and Robert "Big Sonny" Edwards. In 1969, Sam Brown was replaced as lead singer by Bobby Starr, only to rejoin the group in 1973.

In 1965, when songwriters and record producers Kenny Gamble and Leon Huff first contemplated leaving the Cameo-Parkway record label to risk launching their own label, the vocalists on which they pinned all their hopes and venture capital were The Intruders. Like many other subsequent acts the duo produced, which included Harold Melvin and the Blue Notes and The O'Jays, The Intruders had already developed a vocal sound that was both theirs and uniquely Philadelphian.

Brown, Daughtry, Terry and Edwards had been recording and performing one-off singles together since 1961, blending Philly's street corner doo-wop tradition with black gospel fervor. The result was neither as pop-infected as Motown, nor as funky and blues-inflected as Stax. The sound which The Intruders refined for the Excel, Gamble and Philadelphia International imprints reflected a different attitude than either Stax or Motown.

Gamble and Huff's success with The Intruders helped convince Columbia Records to grant them the money to launch Philadelphia International. Gamble and Huff acknowledged that their work with The Intruders was the foundation of what they called "The Sound of Philadelphia".

The Intruders, meanwhile, were undergoing some internal turmoil. When the group resurfaced on the 1970 Gamble LP, When We Get Married, lead singer Brown was replaced by Bobby Starr. The title song, "When We Get Married" (R&B No. 8, Pop #45), a Dreamlovers cover, became a hit on the charts, as was the follow-up "Win, Place or Show (She's a Winner)" (UK #14). Starr's tenure with the group included Soul Train television appearances, and the rare collector's single, "I'm Girl Scoutin". Brown returned to the group in 1973 for the album Save the Children, which spawned The Intruders' last two big hits, "I Wanna Know Your Name" (R&B No. 9, Pop #60) and "I'll Always Love My Mama" (R&B No. 6, Pop #36). Kenny Gamble's mother Ruby, the inspiration for "I'll Always Love My Mama", died March 10, 2012, in Mount Airy, Pennsylvania, at age 96.

Cowboys to Girls... and cover versions
"Cowboys to Girls" (R&B No. 1, Pop #6), the only chart topping single of their career, was a 1968 Top 10 Pop and R&B smash that was awarded an RIAA gold disc for one million sales in mid-May 1968.

During the late 1970s and early 1980s, their music was popular on the West Coast among Latino, specifically Chicano, youth, as evidenced by their covers by the Hacienda Brothers and Tierra. Daughtry died of cancer on December 25, 1994, at age 55, and lead singer Sam "Little Sonny" Brown committed suicide in 1995 at age 54. According to Marc Taylor, in the book, "A Touch of Classic Soul of the Early 1970's" (1996, Aloiv Publishing, Jamaica, New York), in 1975, the other two original Intruders, Robert Edwards and Phil Terry, walked away from the industry after becoming Jehovah's Witnesses.  Edwards died on October 15, 2016, from a heart attack at age 74, leaving Phil Terry as the last surviving original member, as of 2018.

The Intruders today include Bobby Starr, Glenn Montgomery and Phil Gay. The group is featured on the "My Music" DVD hosted by Patti LaBelle on PBS and tour with the Love Train: Sound of Philadelphia Concert series. There are also several tribute groups, including "The Philly Intruders", who appear on "The Big Show" DVD, and "The Fabulous Intruders", founded by William Payton, Sr.

Discography

Studio albums

Compilation albums

Singles

References

Bibliography

External links

 YouTube Video: The Intruders (with Bobby Starr) "I Bet He Don't Love You"
 YouTube Video: The Intruders (with original lead singer Sam "Little Sonny" Brown) "Cowboys to Girls" 
 YouTube Video: The Intruders (with original lead singer Sam "Little Sonny" Brown) "I'll Always Love My Mama"
 YouTube Video: The Intruders (with original lead singer Sam "Little Sonny" Brown) "I Wanna Know Your Name"
 YouTube Video: The Intruders (with original lead singer Sam "Little Sonny" Brown) "(Win, Place or Show) She's a Winner"

Musical groups from Philadelphia
American soul musical groups
Philadelphia International Records artists